Beastie Boys Story is a 2020 American live documentary film, directed, produced, and written by Spike Jonze, alongside Michael Diamond and Adam Horovitz. It was filmed at Kings Theatre in Brooklyn, New York and adapted from Beastie Boys Book, a memoir of the Beastie Boys. Jonze reunited with Diamond and Horovitz for the project after directing several music videos including "Sabotage" in 1994.

It was scheduled to be released in a limited cinema release on April 3, 2020, followed by digital streaming on April 24, 2020, by Apple TV+. The limited cinema release was cancelled due to the COVID-19 pandemic.

Cast
 Michael Diamond as himself
 Adam Horovitz as himself
 Adam Yauch as himself (archival content)
 Bill Hader as Crazy Shit Voice
 Michael K. Williams as Bob Dylan
 Ben Stiller, David Cross and Steve Buscemi as Audience Members

Release
Beastie Boys Story was scheduled to have its world premiere at South by Southwest on March 16, 2020, but the festival was cancelled due to the COVID-19 pandemic. The film was also scheduled to be released in a limited cinema release on April 3, 2020 in selected IMAX cinemas, but it was pulled from the schedule due to cinema closures that started in mid March because of the pandemic restrictions. Digital streaming was made available on Apple TV+ on April 24, 2020.

Reception

Critical reception 
On review aggregator Rotten Tomatoes, the film has an approval rating of 94% based on 84 reviews. The website's critical consensus, which is a reference to the 1986 Beastie Boys song Paul Revere, reads, "Here's a Beastie Boys Story they had to tell, about three bad brothers you know so well. It started way back in history -- and for new or old fans, it's a must-see." It has a score of 75 out of 100 on Metacritic, a site that aggregates a normalized rating, indicating "generally positive reviews".

Erik Adams of The A.V. Club gave the film a C+ and criticized it for poor pacing and lacking fun. His review concludes: "There's not a lot of new insights or Criterion Collection-worthy film-making on offer, but for fans, the documentary will be a reminder of why they got into Ad-Rock, MCA, and Mike D in the first place. It's all there in the outtakes: The Beastie Boys story is simply too big, too strange, too unwieldy for Beastie Boys Story to contain it."

Accolades

References

External links
 Beastie Boys Story on Apple TV+
 

2020 films
2020 documentary films
Beastie Boys
Films directed by Spike Jonze
Apple TV+ original films
Films not released in theaters due to the COVID-19 pandemic
American documentary films
2020s English-language films
2020s American films